Keť is a village and municipality in the Levice District in the Nitra Region of Slovakia.

History
In historical records the village was first mentioned in 1308.

Geography
The village lies at an altitude of 150 metres and covers an area of 19.65 km². It has a population of about 680 people.

Ethnicity
The village is approximately 94% Magyar and 6% Slovak.

Government
The village has its own birth registry.

Facilities
The village has a public library, a gym, and a soccer pitch.

External links
https://web.archive.org/web/20080111223415/http://www.statistics.sk/mosmis/eng/run.html

Villages and municipalities in Levice District